Dudhsagar Falls is a four-tiered waterfall located on the Mandovi River in the Indian state of  Goa. It is 60 km from Panaji by road and is located on the Belgavi–Vasco Da Gama rail route about 46 km east of Madgaon and 80 km south of Belgavi. Dudhsagar Falls is amongst India's tallest waterfalls with a height of 310 m (1017 feet) and an average width of 30 metres (100 feet).

The falls are located in the Bhagwan Mahaveer Sanctuary and Mollem National Park among the Western Ghats. The falls are a punctuation mark in the journey of the Mandovi River from the Western Ghats to Panjim where it meets the Arabian sea. The area is surrounded by deciduous forests with rich biodiversity. This waterfall is also known as Tambdi Surla to some of the local people. The falls are not particularly spectacular during the dry season but during the monsoon season, however, the falls are fed by rains and form a huge force of water.

Access

The nearest rail station accessible by road to the falls is Castle Rock, Uttara Kannada, Karnataka. Visitors could get in a train from here and disembark at the Dudhsagar stop. The Dudhsagar rail stop is not a station where passengers can expect a platform. Passengers and visitors have to climb down the steep ladder of the rail compartment in a short 1-2 minute unscheduled stop. From this rail stop, visitors have to walk about a kilometre on the tracks to arrive at the falls. While the walk itself is something unexpected for a popular tourist destination, there is a 200 m train tunnel that is totally dark which makes the walk a bit tougher. Recently Indian Railways has banned people from boarding/deboarding passengers at Dudhsagar railway.

One can reach the Dudhsagar Waterfalls with the help of Bhagwan Mahavir Wildlife sanctuary Taxi near a Goan Village called Molem. This Association will take you through lush green forest and some heavy flowing streams and get back to you same place. Currently, this is the only access to the Waterfall. The plus point of going through Association is one can see the full view of Dudhsagar Waterfall whereas if you go by Indian Railway you will see half of the waterfall view only.

Dudhsagar trek
There has been a lot of hype about Dudhsagar trek being closed to the general public. The Dudhsagar railway trek has been officially closed to the general public but the trek to the Dudhsagar falls bottom is still open to all.

There are two routes to reach there. One is starting the trek from Kulem and following the jeep trail until the bottom of the waterfall. The second option is via the railway track which is roughly around 11 km. This trek is not allowed by the Government of Goa ( Forest Department) as it is very risky being on a railway track with minimum safety. Anyone trekking along the Railway trek can be heavily fined and can even land you in Jail. You can trek up to the Sonaulim station and join back to the Mud route. This route would save 2 km on the Mud road. During the monsoon season, it is mandatory to hire a guide and get a life jacket in order to start the trek, otherwise, entry inside the forest is restricted because the area experiences extremely heavy rainfall, and the water displacement around the fall is potentially very large, so it is always better to carry a life jacket. It is advisable not to venture into the water at the base of the fall during monsoon as the flow of the water is very fast & dangerous.   

The best time to visit the fall is between October to May as the access to the fall is open for the Jeep. This jeep can be hired from the local Dudhsagar Jeep Association counter at Collem. You have to pay as much as Rs. 500 per person for a jeep ride and maximum of seven people in one jeep. This jeep will take you to the base of the fall. You will have to pay entry fees to the department of forest to enter their area as this Falls comes under their jurisdiction. You get maximum of one & half hours to spend at the fall before you return back to the jeep you came by. The same jeep will then drop you back to Collem for your onward Journey.  The Jeep safari is extremely fun and adventurous as there are chances of you seeing Wild life on the way.

See also
List of waterfalls of India
Braganza Ghats
Bondla Wildlife Sanctuary

References

External links

 

Waterfalls of Karnataka
Waterfalls of Goa
Tourist attractions in Goa
Geography of Uttara Kannada district
Waterfalls of India